The Ark of Taste is an international catalogue of endangered heritage foods which is maintained by the global Slow Food movement. The Ark is designed to preserve at-risk foods that are sustainably produced, unique in taste, and part of a distinct ecoregion. Contrary to the most literal definition of plant and animal conservation, the Ark of Taste aims to maintain edibles in its purview by actively encouraging their cultivation for consumption. By doing so, Slow Food hopes to promote the growing and eating of foods which are sustainable and preserve biodiversity in the human food chain.

Foods included in the list are intended to be "culturally or historically linked to a specific region, locality, ethnicity or traditional production practice", in addition to being rare. Which foods meet these criteria is decided by an adjudicating committee made up of members of the Slow Food nonprofit organization; all candidates go through a formal nomination process which includes tastings and identification of producers within the region.

Since the foundation of the Ark in 1996, 5312 products (September 2021) from over 130 countries have been included and growing daily. The list includes not only prepared foods and food products, but also a great many livestock breeds, as well as vegetable and fruit cultivars. All foods in the catalogue are accompanied by a list of resources for those wishing to grow or buy them.

A selected list of Ark of Taste foods

Ark of Taste foods in Italy
The sources for the Italian section, unless other specified, are the lists selectable from "Ark of Taste", Fondazione Slow Food per la Biodiversità.

Ark of Taste foods in the United States

Ark of Taste foods throughout the world

See also

Biodiversity
Heirloom plant
Local food
List of food origins
Rare breed (agriculture)
Slow Food

Similar organizations
The Livestock Conservancy
Rare Breeds Survival Trust

References

Further reading

External links
 Slow Food Foundation for Biodiversity
 the Ark of Taste on localharvest.org
 Slow Food Foundation for Biodiversity - Ark of Taste at Google Cultural Institute

Slow Food
Sustainable agriculture
Food politics
Projects established in 1996